Eutetrapha chrysochloris is a species of beetle in the family Cerambycidae. It was described by Henry Walter Bates in 1879, originally under the genus Paraglenea.

Varietas
 Eutetrapha chrysochloris var. breuningi (Pic, 1952)
 Eutetrapha chrysochloris var. chrysargyrea (Bates, 1884)
 Eutetrapha chrysochloris var. podanyi (Pic, 1953)

References

Saperdini
Beetles described in 1879